Heze, formerly known as Caozhou, is the westernmost prefecture-level city in Shandong province, China, it borders Jining to the east and the provinces of Henan and Anhui to the west and south respectively.

History
Caozhou was at the center of the Nian Rebellion during the 1850s and 60s.

In August 1949, Heze was detached from Shandong and given to the experimental province of Pingyuan. It returned to Shandong just over three years later.

In April 1953, Heze and Jining gained counties from the former prefecture of Huxi after its abolishment.

City Flower 
Mudan is the city flower of Heze. The earliest documentary of Mudan is in Classic of Poetry (诗经), which is almost 3,000 years away from now. Mudan is also called the King of flower from Bencao Gangmu(本草纲目). It is a symbol of honor, peace, wealth, love, aristocracy, and feminine beauty. There are 9 types of Mudan based on the colors: red, white, purple, yellow, blue, green, black, pink, and multi-colored.

Climate
Heze has a monsoon-influenced climate that lies between the humid subtropical and humid continental zones (Köppen Cwa/Dwa), with four well-defined seasons. The city is warm and nearly rainless in spring, hot and humid in summer, crisp in autumn and cold and dry in winter. Nearly 70% of the annual precipitation occurs from June to September. With monthly percent possible sunshine ranging from 48% in July to 60% in May, the city receives 2,411 hours of bright sunshine annually.

Administration

The prefecture-level city of Heze administers nine county-level divisions. The municipal executive, legislature and judiciary are in Mudan District, together with CPC and Public Security bureaux.

There are two districts and seven counties:
Mudan District
Dingtao District
Cao County
Chengwu County - originally in Huxi
Shan County - originally in Huxi
Juye County - originally in Huxi
Yuncheng County
Juancheng County
Dongming County

These are further divided into 158 township-level divisions.

Demographics
According to the 2010 population census, Heze was home to 8,287,693 people, of whom 1,346,717 live in the built-up area around the seat of government in Mudan District.

Culture

Places of Interests 

 Caozhou Mudan Garden: It is the largest Mudan Garden in Heze with the most varieties.
 One Hundred Lion Square: It is famous for its column carved 100 different posture stone lions. It is the symbol of best wishes and longevities. The archway is 14 meters high and 9 meters wide. The 100 lions with different shapes represent superb architectural skills and immortal artistic value, which fully embodies the wisdom and strength of the ancient people.
 Shui Hu Hero City: It is famous for the teaching and communication of martial arts and ancient buildings. It is also the Chinese ancient residence museum, CCTV recommended tour routes, and the source of Water Margins.

Foods 

 Shanxian Lamb Soup: The soup is founded in 1807. The taste is fresh but not mutton, and fragrant but not greasy. After more than 200 years of development and innovation of soup, it can be carried forward and accepted in many years. It is not only refreshing, but also functional in medicinal meal.
 Peony Cake: During the Flower Festival is the season when peonies are in full bloom, Wu Zetian led a maid to enjoy the flowers in the garden and ordered the maid to pluck a large number of flowers of various colors. After return to the palace, according to her design, she mashed them with rice, and steamed them to make a cake, which is called "Hundred Flower Cake". And she used this dessert as a gift to the officials.
 Pijia Roast Chicken: The sauce is in color red, and you can smell the rich roast chicken scent just a few feet away from the pot. Its outstanding characteristics are fresh, fragrant, and tender with consistent taste inside and out.
 Caozhou Sesame Cake: Its shape is round as moon, tender inside with a crispy crust. It has ingredients of wheat essence powder, sesame oil, salt, pepper, fennel powder and other ingredients made of oil flesh.

Transportation 
Highway: China National Highway 220; China National Highway 105; China National Highway 106; China National Highway 240; China National Highway 327
Heze Mudan Airport opened on April 2, 2021.
Conventional rail services call at Heze railway station, high-speed services call at Heze East railway station.

Famous Figures 

 Ancient times: Fuxi , Yao, Shun, Song Jiang, Wu Yong, Cao Zhi
 Current: Peng Liyuan , Fan Shaohuang

Economy
Heze is the largest center in China for the cultivation of the "national flower" peony, after which the Mudan District was named. Over 30% of its GDP comes from the sale of peony.

Sister Cities
Mobile, Alabama

References

External links

Official website 

 
Cities in Shandong
Prefecture-level divisions of Shandong